McTavish is a surname of Scottish and Irish origin, deriving from a Gaelic form of Thomas meaning “twin”. Notable people with the surname include: 

Bob McTavish (born 1944), Australian surfboard designer
Bob McTavish (footballer) (1888-1972), Scottish footballer
Dale McTavish (born 1972), Canadian professional ice hockey player
Devon McTavish (born 1984), American professional soccer player
George Archibald McTavish (1856-1886), farmer and politician
Gord McTavish (born 1954), Canadian professional ice hockey player
Gordon McTavish (1925–2019), Canadian curler and judge
Graham McTavish (born 1961), Scottish actor and voice actor
Jessie McTavish, Scottish nurse convicted in 1974 of murdering a patient with insulin
John McTavish (footballer, born 1885), Scottish footballer
John McTavish (footballer, born 1932), Scottish footballer
John McTavish (politician), Canadian politician
Mason McTavish (born 2003), Swiss professional ice hockey player
Megan McTavish (born 1949), American television actress
Rachel McTavish, British television journalist and presenter
Simon McTavish (1750–1804), Scots-Canadian businessman, fur trader, and philanthropist

See also
 École McTavish Junior High Public School
 McTavish reservoir
 McTavish Street
 Waldo McTavish Skillings (1906–1981), politician and insurance agent